The Men's 66 kg competition at the 2018 World Judo Championships was held on 21 September 2018.

Results

Finals

Repechage

Pool A
Preliminary round fights

Pool B
Preliminary round fights

Pool C
Preliminary round fights

Pool D
Preliminary round fights

Prize money
The sums listed bring the total prizes awarded to 57,000€ for the individual event.

References

External links
 
 Draw

M66
World Judo Championships Men's Half Lightweight